Athanasios Frontistis (1900–1979) was a Greek Army officer who rose to the rank of Lieutenant General, and held the post of Chief of the Hellenic National Defence General Staff. He was also elected twice as an MP with the National Radical Union, and served briefly as Minister for Communications in April 1967.

Biography
Born in Skiathos in 1900, Athanasios Frontistis entered the Hellenic Army Academy and was commissioned an officer in 1922. He fought in the Asia Minor Campaign, the Greco-Italian War, and the Greek Civil War. During the Axis occupation of Greece, he was a member of the Panhellenic Liberation Organization.

In 1959–62, with the rank of Lt. General, he served as Chief of the Hellenic National Defence General Staff.

After retirement, he was elected an MP for Magnesia Prefecture with the right-wing National Radical Union in the 1963 and 1964 elections.

He also served as Minister of Communications in the caretaker cabinet of Panagiotis Kanellopoulos in April 1967, that was abolished by the coup d'état of 21 April 1967.

He died in January 1979 and was buried in the First Cemetery of Athens.

References 

1900 births
1979 deaths
People from Skiathos
Hellenic Army generals
Chiefs of the Hellenic National Defence General Staff
Greek military personnel of the Greek Civil War
Greek military personnel of the Greco-Turkish War (1919–1922)
Greek military personnel of World War II
Greek MPs 1963–1964
Greek MPs 1964–1967
National Radical Union politicians
Greek Resistance members
Burials at the First Cemetery of Athens